Isiordia is a surname.  Notable people with the surname include:

 Alejandra Isiordia (born 1994), Mexican volleyball player
 Raúl Isiordia (born 1952), Mexican footballer